Gündüzbey is a village in the Söğüt District, Bilecik Province, Turkey. Its population is 158 (2021).

References

Villages in Söğüt District